Nova Jošava is a village in north-eastern Slavonia, situated in municipality town of Orahovica, Virovitica-Podravina County, Croatia.

Population

References
 CD-rom: "Naselja i stanovništvo RH od 1857-2001. godine", Izdanje Državnog zavoda za statistiku Republike Hrvatske, Zagreb, 2005.

Populated places in Virovitica-Podravina County